Madison Pomeroy Hildebrand (born October 28, 1980) is an American media personality and realtor specializing in the luxury real estate market located in Malibu, California. A broker with Partners Trust Real Estate, Hildebrand formerly co-starred in the Bravo television series Million Dollar Listing Los Angeles, alongside Josh Flagg and Josh Altman. In 2009, Hildebrand released a book, Activate Your Passion, Create Your Career. In 2013, Hildebrand launched a scented candle collection called The Malibu Life By Madison Hildebrand. He is also a brand ambassador for the eSignature company, DocuSign, and produces a national seminar tour where Hildebrand coaches realtors across the country.

Personal life
Hildebrand graduated from Pepperdine University, in Malibu. Openly gay, having come out in December 2009, Hildebrand appeared on The Millionaire Matchmaker looking for love. His brother, John Hildebrand, is the owner of Sicky's Eyewear. Hildebrand is an inactive member of the Church of Jesus Christ of Latter-day Saints.

References

External links
 Futon Critic interview with Madison Hildebrand
 Sicky's Eyewear
 Madison Hildebrand Real Estate Website

American television personalities
Living people
Gay men
LGBT people from Arizona
LGBT people from California
Pepperdine University alumni
1980 births
Former Latter Day Saints
Participants in American reality television series